Arnold "Arnie" Morgan  (born 19 September 1942) is an English former professional rugby league footballer who played in the 1960s and 1970s.

Background
Arnie Morgan was born in Pontefract, West Riding of Yorkshire, England, he worked a refuse collector .

Playing career

International honours
Arnie Morgan, won a cap for England while at Featherstone Rovers in 1968 against Wales, and won caps for Great Britain while at Featherstone Rovers in 1968 against France (2 matches), and in the 1968 Rugby League World Cup against France, and New Zealand.

County honours
Arnie Morgan won caps for Yorkshire while at Featherstone Rovers; during the 1967–68 season as an interchange/substitute against Australia, during the 1968–69 season against Cumberland and Lancashire, and during the 1969–70 season as an interchange/substitute against Lancashire.

Challenge Cup Final appearances
Arnie Morgan played left-, i.e. number 11, and scored a try in Featherstone Rovers' 17-12 victory over Barrow in the 1966–67 Challenge Cup Final during the 1966–67 season at Wembley Stadium, London on Saturday 13 May 1967, in front of a crowd of 76,290.

County Cup Final appearances
Arnie Morgan played left-, i.e. number 11, in Featherstone Rovers' 12-25 defeat by Hull Kingston Rovers in the 1966–67 Yorkshire County Cup Final during the 1966–67 season at Headingley Rugby Stadium, Leeds on Saturday 15 October 1966, and played left- in the 9-12 defeat by Hull F.C. in the 1969–70 Yorkshire County Cup Final during the 1969–70 season at Headingley Rugby Stadium, Leeds on Saturday 20 September 1969.

Club career
Arnie Morgan made his début for Featherstone Rovers on Saturday 17 February 1962, he appears to have scored no drop-goals (or field-goals as they are currently known in Australasia), but prior to the 1974–75 season all goals, whether; conversions, penalties, or drop-goals, scored 2-points, consequently prior to this date drop-goals were often not explicitly documented, therefore '0' drop-goals may indicate drop-goals not recorded, rather than no drop-goals scored.

Testimonial match
Arnie Morgan's benefit season/testimonial match at Featherstone Rovers took place during the 1971–72 season.

Honoured at Featherstone Rovers
Arnie Morgan is a Featherstone Rovers Hall of Fame inductee.

Genealogical information
Arnie Morgan is the son of Albert Morgan and Violet (née Barker), the younger brother of Brian Morgan, the grandson of the rugby league footballer for Featherstone Rovers, Joseph "Joe" Morgan (Heritage № 26), the great-nephew of Joseph "Joe" Morgan's brothers, the rugby league footballers for Featherstone Rovers, the brothers; Thomas "Tom"/"Tommy" Morgan  (Heritage № 79), and Luke Morgan (Heritage № 90), and the cousin of the rugby league footballers for Featherstone Rovers; Denis/Dennis Morgan (Heritage № 425), and Mick Morgan.

References

External links

1942 births
Living people
England national rugby league team players
English rugby league players
Featherstone Rovers players
Great Britain national rugby league team players
Rugby league players from Pontefract
Rugby league props
Rugby league second-rows
York Wasps players
Yorkshire rugby league team players